This is a list of notable role-playing game artists, past and present. The people in this list created artwork for one or more notable, published role-playing game book, miniature, or other product.

A

Jason Banditt Adams - Desolation RPG by Greymalkin Designs, Mongoose Publishing's series such as Traveller, CONAN, Elric and others, as well as HERO Games titles
Attila Adorjany - his work has appeared in comics, video games, film, TV, and roleplaying games  including products by White Wolf, Wizards of the Coast, Fantasy Flight Games, and Steve Jackson Games
Dave Allsop - his art appears in games for Wizards of the Coast and his own creation SLA Industries for Nightfall Games 
Glen Angus
Samuel Araya - his published cover art includes Unknown Armies 2nd Ed. (Atlas Games), Weapons of the Gods (Eos Press), Tibet: The Roleplaying Game (Vajra Enterprises), along with various White Wolf / World of Darkness titles and All Flesh Must Be Eaten supplements

B

Arnal Ballester - main art designer in the Barcelona Joc Internacional publishing house; painted covers for LÍDER (Joc Internacional's magazine), game master's screens (RuneQuest); designed logos, including the LÍDER logo and the Spanish translation logo for Stormbringer
Ghislain Barbe - several White Wolf products, including titles from the Exalted setting
George Barr
Thomas Baxa
Denis Beauvais
Carlo Bocchio (also known as Jackoilrain) - Dungeons & Dragons 
Tim Bradstreet - many early White Wolf projects, most notably Vampire: The Masquerade
Brom - many TSR products (predominantly Dark Sun), Palladium Books covers, the inspiration for Deadlands
Frank Brunner - illustrated different editions of Stormbringer
Guy Burwell - GURPS Goblins
Jeff Butler - Dungeons and Dragons and Marvel Super Heroes RPG

C

Clyde Caldwell
Matt Cavotta
Douglas Chaffee
Javier Charro - illustrated for Mongoose Publishing, Fantasy Flight Games, Hero Games, Mythic Dreams
Miguel Coimbra
Jim Crabtree
Dennis Cramer
Carl Critchlow

D

Ned Dameron
Liz Danforth - Tunnels and Trolls artist
Stephen Daniele
Darlene
Gene Day - cover art of the first Call of Cthulhu edition (1981)
Jeff Dee - many early TSR products, including Deities and Demigods
Eric Deschamps
Brian Despain
Tony DiTerlizzi - many early TSR products including 2nd Edition Monster Manual and Planescape series 
Larry Dixon
Vincent Dutrait - Dragon Magazine, Call of Cthulhu, The Dark Eye, Warhammer Fantasy Roleplay

E

Jeff Easley - many early TSR products including the Dragonlance series, and the cover to the second edition of the Player's Handbook
Steve Ellis - many White Wolf products, most notably Werewolf: The Apocalypse; many Wizards of the Coast projects; Dungeons and Dragons, Magic: The Gathering and Kaijudo 
Larry Elmore - many early TSR products, including the Dragonlance series
Wayne England
Jason Engle
Newton Ewell

F

Stephen Fabian
Emily Fiegenschuh
Fred Fields
Scott Fischer
Phil Foglio - GURPS IOU, S.P.A.N.C., the Xxxenophile card game
Carl Frank
Ken Frank
Dan Frazier
Frank Kelly Freas

G

Rafael Garres
Donato Giancola
Lars Grant-West
Rebecca Guay

H

Brian Hagan
Henry Higginbotham
The Brothers Hildebrandt
Jim Holloway
Quinton Hoover
Daniel Horne
Ralph Horsley
David Hudnut

I

Frazer Irving

J

Kennon James - published art includes work for Wizards of the Coast, Sabertooth Games
Jennell Jaquays
Jeremy Jarvis
Andrew Johanson - Fantasy Flight Games
Leif Jones - numerous illustrations for White Wolf's Vampire: The Masquerade, Werewolf: The Apocalypse, and Mage: The Ascension; Sword and Sorcery Studios, AEG, Necromancer Games, Holistic Design, Mythic Dreams
Veronica V. Jones

K
Michael William Kaluta
Dana Knutson
Doug Kovacs

L

David S. LaForce
John and Laura Lakey
Hubert de Lartigue - illustrated covers, sourcebooks and supplements in the French gaming industry, such as the French translations of RuneQuest, Land of Ninja, and Stormbringer; some of his covers were used in publications in other languages, like his RuneQuest supplement cover Genertela, used in the United States and Spain
Rob Lazzaretti
April Lee - cover and interior art for a variety of titles including Legend of the Five Rings and 7th Sea (Alderac), In Nomine (Steve Jackson Games), and Kingdoms of Kalamar (Kenzer & Co.)
Jody Lee - cover art for the third edition of RuneQuest (1984) and the first of Pendragon (1985)
Vince Locke
Todd Lockwood
Eric Lofgren - credits include magazine articles, interior illustrations, and cover art including the cover art for Steve Jackson Games' GURPS Steam-Tech and Hero Games's Champions Viper
Kevin Long - premier artist at Palladium Books from 1986 to 1995 whose work on Rifts and Robotech are foremost among his wide-ranging contributions to Palladium's earlier RPG series, which include Beyond the Supernatural, Heroes Unlimited, and Teenage Mutant Ninja Turtles
Roger Loveless
Howard Lyon

M

Diana Magnuson
David L. Martin
Max - pen name of Francesc Capdevila, who signed numerous covers and inner illustrations for LÍDER (Joc Internacional's magazine)
Angus McBride -  main illustrator of the MERP series of rulebooks, sourcebooks and supplements
Raven Mimura
Jeff Miracola
Matthew Mitchell

N
Jim Nelson
Mark Nelson
Russ Nicholson
Terese Nielsen - famous for her Magic: The Gathering card illustrations; did the cover artwork for the Dungeons & Dragons setting Jakandor in 1998 (Jakandor, Land of Legend and Jakandor, Isle of Destiny); in 1998 she illustrated the covers of three issues of Dragon and several Forgotten Realms novels; in 1999 she started illustrating covers for the 7th Sea role-playing game

O

William O'Connor
Erik Jon Oredson - The DNDBBS project DNDBBS
Erol Otus - many early TSR products including S3: Expedition to Barrier Peaks

P

Keith Parkinson
Lucio Parrillo
Jim Pavelec
Michael Phillippi
Eric Polak
Alan Pollack
Randy Post
Steve Prescott
Stephanie Pui-Mun Law
Steve Purcell - several covers for the Different Worlds magazine and RuneQuest supplements

R

Vinod Rams
Roger Raupp
Adam Rex
Wayne Reynolds
David Roach
Jennifer Rodgers - illustrations for publishers, including Blue Devil Games, Decipher Inc., Adept Press, and Anvilwerks
Jim Roslof
Luis Royo - painted some covers for Spanish role-playing games: first edition Fuerza Delta (1991) and second edition Far West (1994)

S

Richard Sardinha
Christopher Shy
Kevin Siembieda - worked at Judges Guild illustrating adventure modules for Dungeons & Dragons, RuneQuest, and Traveller, 1979-1981); after founding Palladium Books, his art and cartography were featured in The Mechanoid Invasion, first edition Palladium Fantasy and Heroes Unlimited, and early Rifts titles
Dan Smith - interior art for GURPS books
Mark Smylie
Brian Snoddy
John T. Snyder
Ron Spencer
Anne Stokes
David C. Sutherland III - early TSR products and book covers, A Paladin in Hell
Arnie Swekel
Tony Szczudlo

T

Jean Pierre Targete
Ben Templesmith
Miles Teves - Skyrealms of Jorune; later became a renowned Hollywood conceptual artist
Joel Thomas
David A. Trampier - TSR Hobbies Staff Illustrator; creator of Wormy, a comic strip that ran in The Dragon magazine; infamous for mysteriously vanishing for decades before resurfacing in a newspaper interview as a cab driver
Timothy Truman - TSR Hobbies Staff Illustrator (early 1980s)
Francis Tsai

V

Valerie Valusek
Susan Van Camp
Jon Van Caneghem - responsible for the Might and Magic series
Franz Vohwinkel

W

Kev Walker
Karl Waller
Kevin Wasden
Anthony S. Waters
Tom Wham
Michael Whelan - many TSR products including 2nd Edition Player's Handbook and Dungeon Master's Guide; his Elric illustration for the 1977 revised edition of the Stormbringer novel was used by Chaosium to illustrate the fourth edition (1990) of the Stormbringer role-playing game
Chuck Whelon
Eva Widermann
Bill Willingham - many early golden age TSR products, notably the Basic and Advanced Dungeons and Dragons rulebooks;  wrote and drew the Elementals comics;  scripted the Fables comic series
Robin Wood
Sam Wood
Ben Wootten

Y

Kieran Yanner - has been published by Decipher, Inc., Dream Pod 9, Eden Studios, Inc., Fantasy Flight Games, Necromancer Games, Steve Jackson Games, Sword and Sorcery Studios, Troll Lord Games and White Wolf

References

Dynamic lists
Artists
Role-playing game artists